The Renaissance Players were an Australian early music ensemble directed by Winsome Evans. Their album Mirror of Light received a nomination for the 1997 ARIA Award for Best Classical Album.

Discography
Memories Of English Minstrelsy (1976) – Viking
Adam's Apple (1977) – Cherry Pie
The Captive Unicorn (2LP) (1978) – Cherry Pie
The Sibyl's Giggle (1979) – Cherry Pie
The Cat's Fiddlestick (1981) – Cherry Pie
The Muses' Gift (Dances I) (1993) – Walsingham Classics
Venus' Fire (Dances II) (1994) – Walsingham Classics
The Ring Of Creation (Dances III) (1994) – Walsingham Classics
Garland Dances (Dances IV) (1995) –  Walsingham Classics
Songs For A Wise King (Cantigas I) (1996) –  Walsingham Classics
Maria Morning Star (Cantigas II) (1996) –  Walsingham Classics
Mirror of Light (Cantigas III) (1996) –  Walsingham Classics
Thorns Of Fire (The Sephardic Experience I) (1998) – Celestial Harmonies
Apples & Honey (The Sephardic Experience II) (1998) – Celestial Harmonies
Gazelle & Flea (The Sephardic Experience III) (1999) – Celestial Harmonies
Eggplants (The Sephardic Experience IV) (1999) – Celestial Harmonies
Testament (Archangels' Banquet/Shepherds' Delight) (2CD) (2000) – Celestial Harmonies
Of Numbers And Miracles – Selected Cantigas de Santa Maria (2001) – Celestial Harmonies
Adam's Apple (Limited CD reissue) (2006) – Cherry Pie
The Sibyl's Giggle (Limited CD reissue) (2006) – Cherry Pie
Pilgrimage to Montserrat (2CD) (2014) – Tall Poppies
Memories Of English Minstrelsy (Expanded Limited CD reissue with bonus archive material) (2014)
Pillar of Wisdom (Cantigas IV) (2014) – Tall Poppies
Gabriel’s Message (Cantigas V) (2014)<ref>{{Citation | last = Ballam-Cross| first = Paul | date = 31 July 2015 | title = 'Gabriel’s Message (The Renaissance Players/Winsome Evans) | periodical = Limelight Magazine | url = https://www.limelightmagazine.com.au/reviews/gabriels-message-the-renaissance-playerswinsome-evans/ }}</ref> – Tall Poppies

Awards and nominations
ARIA Music Awards
The ARIA Music Awards is an annual awards ceremony that recognises excellence, innovation, and achievement across all genres of Australian music. They commenced in 1987. 

! 
|-
| 1997
| Mirror of Light''
| Best Classical Album
| 
| 
|-

See also
 Frederick May

References

New South Wales musical groups